Ronco Briantino (Milanese: Ronc) is a comune (municipality) in the Province of Monza and Brianza in the Italian region Lombardy, located about  northeast of Milan.

Ronco Briantino borders the following municipalities: Merate, Robbiate, Osnago, Verderio Inferiore, Bernareggio, Carnate.

References

External links
 Official website